Larrowe House, also known as The Cohocton Town and Village Hall, is a historic home located at Cohocton in Steuben County, New York.  It is a 38 by 40 foot, two story dwelling constructed in 1856 in the Italianate style.  There is a square cupola in the center of the roof.  The Larrowe family donated the house in 1950 for use as a municipal hall. It remained in that use until the Cohocton Historical Society acquired the house in August 2009.

It was listed on the National Register of Historic Places in 1989.

References

Houses on the National Register of Historic Places in New York (state)
Italianate architecture in New York (state)
Houses completed in 1856
Houses in Steuben County, New York
National Register of Historic Places in Steuben County, New York